The Kreuz Herne (German: Kreuz Herne) is a combination interchange with two cloverleaf links in the German state North Rhine-Westphalia.

The motorway interchange forms the connection between the  A43 Kreuz Münstter-Süd-Kreuz Wuppertal-Nord and the A42 Kreuz Kamp-Lintfort-Kreuz Catrop Rauxel--Ost .

Geography 
The motorway interchange in the city district Mitte in Herne, Nearbe city districts are Herne-Eickel, Mitte and Baukau. The interchange is approximately 20 km west of Dortmund, Approximately 8 km north of Bochum and 15 km northeast of Essen.

Northwest of the interchange lays the Kraftwerk Herne the powerstation for the city.

History 
In 1968 the motorway interchange and the first part of the A42 were opened to traffic. Back then it was the th link between the  des Emscherschnellweg with the EB 51 (temporary road) which later was replaced by the A 43. In the mid 1970s the interchange was changed again due to the build of the A 43.

Building form and road layout 
Near the motorway interchange both motorways are built with 2x2 lanes. The links  A 43-North—A 42-east and A 42-west—A 43-South having 2 lanes  all the other connections have one lane.

Due to the tight space it is built in,  they chose a mixform between a Windmill interchange and a Cloverleaf interchange.

Traffic near the interchange 
Approximately 155,000 vehicles use the interchange on a daily basis.

References

External links 
 Geschichte der A 42 in Deutschland

Herne